25 O'Clock is the debut record by English rock band the Dukes of Stratosphear and the eighth studio album by XTC, released on April Fools Day 1985 through Virgin Records. It was publicised as a long-lost collection of recordings by a late 1960s group, but actually consisted of new tracks recorded by Andy Partridge, Colin Moulding, and Dave Gregory of XTC with Gregory's brother Ian.

The project was conceived by Partridge as a one-off excursion into 1960s-style psychedelic music. Three rules were set during its recording: songs must follow the conventions of 1967 and 1968 psychedelia, no more than two takes allowed, and use vintage equipment wherever possible. Virgin gave the group £5,000 and a two-week deadline for the sessions, in which the members adopted pseudonyms and dressed themselves in clothing of the era. Only six tracks were recorded due to time constraints.

Upon its release in the UK, 25 O'Clock sold twice as many copies as XTC's then-latest album The Big Express (1984), even before the Dukes' identity was made public. One single was issued, "The Mole from the Ministry", which was an improvised-in-the-studio Beatles pastiche. 25 O'Clock was followed up in 1987 with the LP Psonic Psunspot, which contained the outtake "Have You Seen Jackie?". Another outtake, "Big Day", was reworked for XTC's 1986 album Skylarking.

Background

When guitarist Dave Gregory was invited to join XTC in 1979, bandleader and songwriter Andy Partridge learned that they both shared a longtime passion for 1960s psychedelic music. An album of songs in that style was immediately put to consideration, but the group could not go through with it due to their commercial obligations to Virgin Records. Another consideration Partridge had was the punk movement's antipathy toward pop music of the past. XTC stopped touring in 1982 and immediately began focusing on refining their sound in the studio. During the making of their 1984 album The Big Express, Partridge began writing material he thought could potentially be performed in a psychedelic style, the first being "Your Gold Dress". He recalled "beginning [to be unable] to contain the desire to do this. You can see it leaking out earlier".

In November 1984, one month after the release of The Big Express, Partridge traveled to Monmouth, Wales with engineer John Leckie to produce the album Miss America by singer-songwriter Mary Margaret O'Hara, who had recently signed with Virgin. Partridge and Leckie were dismissed due to conflicts related to their religious affiliations or lack thereof (O'Hara was a devout Catholic). Partridge was feeling inspired by Nick Nicely's 1982 psychedelic single "Hilly Fields (1892)", and devised a recording project to fill the newfound gap in his schedule. The rules were as follows: songs must follow the conventions of 1967 and 1968 psychedelia; no more than two takes allowed; vintage equipment wherever possible. Partridge said: "I didn't really have songs ready, just ideas. I knew I wanted to do something like Syd Barrett. Perhaps a Beatles-esque track. ... I rung up the other guys and said 'Hey, let's put on a show!'; you know, that kind of thing."

Recording
Leckie agreed to take on production and searched for a cheap studio for the band. Partridge invited his XTC bandmates to participate; they were augmented on drums by Dave Gregory's brother Ian, since the group did not have a drummer at the time. The song "25 O'Clock" was quickly written as they waited for the project to be greenlit by Virgin. After the label reluctantly loaned the group £5,000, two weeks were spent on the album's recording and mixing at Chapel Lane Studios in Hereford, England. The project was planned as a full-length LP, but only six songs were completed due to time constraints. Partridge looked back on its making as the "most fun we ever had in the studio."

Each musician adopted a pseudonym: "Sir John Johns" (Partridge) "Lord Cornelius Plum" (Dave), "The Red Curtain" (Colin Moulding) and "E.I.E.I. Owen" (Ian). Partridge's moniker came from a 1967 DC Comics martian character, while Moulding's was derived from an old nickname referring to the length of his hair. The band dressed themselves in Paisley outfits for the sessions and lit scented candles. Partridge: "Dave Gregory took to the Dukes a bit too much. Elephant jumbo cord flares, big white belt, beads - we were a bit worried." In contrast to himself and Gregory, "Colin was more of a heavy metal kid. He was more into Black Sabbath and Uriah Heep and people like that. So he didn't really have much of a grasp on psychedelia."

"25 O'Clock" and "Bike Ride to the Moon" were reimaginings of the Electric Prunes' "I Had Too Much to Dream (Last Night)" (1966) and  Tomorrow's "My White Bicycle" (1967), respectively. One of the "best bits on the EP," Partridge later said, was Moulding's "What in the World??...", which featured tape manipulation akin to the Beatles' "Only a Northern Song" (1969). Moulding offered another song, "Big Day", but the group deemed it good enough for the next XTC album. He explained: "The Dukes thing was written in an air of 'Well, it doesn't really matter, we'll tart it all up in the mix.'" "Have You Seen Jackie?", a Pink Floyd–Tomorrow–Keith West–Rolling Stones amalgamation, was also left off the album, later being included on Psonic Psunspot.

Release

Released exclusively in Britain on April Fool's Day 1985, the mini-album was presented as a long-lost collection of recordings by a late 1960s group. Partridge designed its cover art on his kitchen table using colored pens and photocopied 19th-century lettering. Virgin Records publicised the Dukes as a mysterious new act, and when asked about the album in interviews, XTC initially denied having any involvement. A music video set to "The Mole from the Ministry"—the first in which they were allowed total creative input—was produced for BBC West's RPM music programme. Partridge: "That's the only one of our videos that I've liked, the only one I can watch ... every little [promo] film [from 1967] we could find, we put ideas from them in there."

In England, 25 O'Clock sold twice as many copies as The Big Express, even before the Dukes' identity was made public. The album also achieved considerable sales in the US. On XTC's next album Skylarking (1986), the Dukes were mentioned in its liner notes, where they were thanked for the loan of their guitars.

Track listing

Original mini-album

Expanded edition
A remastered and expanded version of 25 O'Clock was released on 20 April 2009 by Partridge's Ape House record label. This edition of 25 O'Clock is credited to "XTC as The Dukes of Stratosphear". It also included the promotional video for "The Mole from the Ministry" as a QuickTime file.

Personnel
Credits adapted from the album's liner notes.

The Dukes of Stratosphear
 Sir John Johns (Andy Partridge) – vocals, guitar, bass on "What in the World??...", sleeve art
 The Red Curtain (Colin Moulding) – vocals, bass, rhythm guitar on "What in the World??..."
 Lord Cornelius Plum (Dave Gregory) – mellotron, piano, organ, fuzz-tone guitar
 E.I.E.I. Owen (Ian "Eewee" Gregory) – drums
Technical
 John Leckie – producer, engineer
 Swami Anand Nagara – producer
 The Dukes of Stratosphear – producer
("Swami Anand Nagara" is an alternate identity of Leckie; both are credited as producers.)

References

External links
 

1985 albums
Albums produced by John Leckie
Virgin Records albums
The Dukes of Stratosphear albums